On Colors (Greek Περὶ χρωμάτων; Latin De Coloribus) is a treatise attributed to Aristotle but sometimes ascribed to Theophrastus or Strato. The work outlines the theory that all colors (yellow, red, purple, blue, and green) are derived from mixtures of black and white. On colors had a pronounced impact on subsequent color theories and remained influential until Isaac Newton's experiments with light refraction.

Section 1 Summary 
Aristotle states in his account that the colors of the basic elements are simple, water and air are naturally white while gold is the color of fire and similar things like the sun are golden, meanwhile more complicated colors are the result of mixtures of these elements. By nature, the Earth is white but is dyed by these mixtures between the natural elements. However, unlike other colors black is not the result of a mixture between natural elements but rather "black belongs to the elements of things while they are undergoing a transformation of their nature." Aristotle writes that black appears in three different ways. First, something is naturally black when light is reflected off it as black.  Secondly, black appears in the absence of light being able to reach the eye. Thirdly, when very little light is reflected all things can look black. Aristotle uses the example of how rough water appears dark because the roughness of the water's surface allows very little light to bounce off. In the same vain, deep water and large clouds appear black because light cannot penetrate them resulting in little light reflecting off and giving them their black color. Aristotle concludes this explanation of the color black saying that in the cases where light cannot penetrate deeply results in darkness or what we call black, but darkness itself is not a color but merely the absence of light. Light does not have a color but all colors are visible because of it. Elements like fire or other things that produce light all have light as their color. Relating back to elements, when burned by fire air and water turn black. Such is the burning coals when doused in water. This is Aristotle's explanation of simple colors

See also
Corpus Aristotelicum

References

External links
 

Color
Pseudoaristotelian works